Robin Chisholm (16 October 1929 – 2 November 1991) was a Scottish international rugby union player.

He was capped for  eleven times between 1955 and 1960. He also played for Melrose RFC.

His brother David Chisholm was also capped for Scotland.

References
 Bath, Richard (ed.) The Scotland Rugby Miscellany (Vision Sports Publishing Ltd, 2007 )

1929 births
1991 deaths
Melrose RFC players
Rugby union players from Scottish Borders
Scotland international rugby union players
Scottish rugby union players
South of Scotland District (rugby union) players